Provoker are an American post-punk band from The San Francisco Bay Area.

Formed by Jonathon Lopez in 2015, Provoker began as a solo project, focused on creating scores for fictional horror films. After coming in contact with singer, songwriter, musician Christian Petty at a screening of the American black comedy The Greasy Strangler, Lopez sent him some of his soundtrack pieces to record vocals over. This melding lead to the band adopting more post-punk influence, finding a middle ground between Lopez's synth driven experimentation and Petty's R&B influenced singing. 

The band was complete in its current form after the release of 2018's Dark Angel EP, now a four piece consisting of guitarist Lopez, bassist Wil Palacios, percussionist Kristian Moreno and vocalist Petty.

Their debut album Body Jumper was released via YEAR0001 on August 13, 2021.

Discography

Albums 
 Body Jumper (2021, YEAR0001)

Extended plays 
 Dark Angel (2018, Life Sucker Productions)

Soundtracks 
 Sneak Peek! (Mercy Stroke OST) (2015, Self-Released)
 Dry City Maniac OST (2017, Smoking Room)

Singles 
 "Dark Angel" (2018, Life Sucker Productions)
 "Since Then" (2020, Life Sucker Productions)
 "Spell Strike" (2021, YEAR0001)
 "Bugs & Humans" (2021, YEAR0001)
 "Rose In A Glass" (2021, YEAR0001)
 "Blue Sheen" (2021, YEAR0001)

References

External links
 
 

Musical groups from San Francisco